Jon Tolaas (3 June 1939–1 September 2012) was a Norwegian teacher, poet and novelist. He was born in Vågsøy. Among his poetry collections are Gjest i ditt tjeld from 1968 and Rapport frå reservatet from 1969. He published the novel Sju in 1971. His book Nattkino. Ei bok om draum from 1992 is based on a former newspaper column that he wrote for Bergens Tidende.

He was awarded the Sogn og Fjordane Cultural Prize in 1987.

References

1939 births
2012 deaths
People from Vågsøy
20th-century Norwegian poets
Norwegian male poets
Norwegian male novelists
20th-century Norwegian novelists
21st-century Norwegian novelists
20th-century Norwegian male writers
21st-century Norwegian male writers
Norwegian columnists